"Honey to the Bee" is a song by English singer turned actress Billie Piper from her debut studio album, Honey to the B (1998). It was released on 22 March 1999 and debuted at number three on the UK Singles Chart, which became its peak position. It was not a hit in mainland Europe, but it became one of Piper's highest-charting songs in Australia and New Zealand, reaching number six in the former country and number five in the latter. In Australia, it was the 48th-best-selling song of 1999.

In January 2007, the song was championed by Radio 1 DJ Chris Moyles as part of an experiment to test out the new UK Singles Chart rules that came into effect that month, which prompted the song to reach number 17 on the UK Singles Chart on 21 January 2007, and number 11 on the UK Download Chart.

Music video

The video, which uses the shorter radio edit version in lieu of the full album version, was directed by Katie Bell, and featured Billie in a computer-animated background.

Track listings

UK 7-inch jukebox vinyl
A. "Honey to the Bee" (radio edit)
B. "She Wants You" (7-inch disco)

UK CD1
 "Honey to the Bee" (radio edit) – 3:39
 "Call Me" – 3:58
 "What's Missing" – 3:46

UK CD2 and Australian CD single
 "Honey to the Bee" (radio edit) – 3:39
 "Honey to the Bee" (acoustic version) – 4:24
 "Honey to the Bee" (Delakota mix) – 5:00
 "Honey to the Bee" (video)

UK cassette single
A1. "Honey to the Bee" (radio edit) – 3:39
A2. "She Wants You" (7-inch disco) – 3:29
B1. Interview – 10:05

European CD single
 "Honey to the Bee" (radio edit) – 3:39
 "Call Me" – 3:58

US 7-inch jukebox single
A. "Honey to the Bee" (radio edit)
B. "Party on the Phone"

Charts and certifications

Weekly charts

Year-end charts

Certifications

Release history

Play version

In June 2003, Swedish girl group Play covered the song on their third album Replay. Play's version featured a trip hop beat and soprano vocals.

References

1998 songs
1999 singles
2003 singles
Billie Piper songs
Innocent Records singles
Songs written by Jim Marr
Songs written by Wendy Page
Virgin Records singles